Dana McLean Greeley (July 5, 1908 – June 13, 1986) was a Unitarian minister, the last president of the American Unitarian Association and, upon its merger with the Universalist Church in America, was the founding president of the Unitarian Universalist Association.

Greeley received a Bachelor of Sacred Theology degree from Harvard Divinity School in 1933 and was ordained by his home parish church in Lexington, Massachusetts. His first two settlements were the Unitarian churches in Lincoln, Massachusetts (1932-1934) and Concord, New Hampshire (1934-1935). In 1935, at the age of 27, he was called to the prestigious Arlington Street Church in Boston where he served until 1958.

After his presidency with the UUA, Rev. Greeley became Visiting Professor of the Church and World Peace at the Meadville Lombard Theological School in Chicago and president of the International Association for Religious Freedom.  In 1970 he returned to parish ministry accepting a call from the First Parish in Concord, Massachusetts where he served until his death in 1986.

During his lifetime Rev. Greeley received many awards, including honorary degrees from Meadville Theological School, Emerson College, St. Lawrence University, Tufts University and Portia Law School. Additionally, the Concord congregation and his friends and colleagues created in his memory the Dana Greeley Foundation which supports grassroots efforts toward making the world more peaceful.

External links
Dana McLean Greeley, in the Dictionary of Unitarian and Universalist Biography
Dana McLean Greeley Foundation for Peace and Justice. Records, 1968-2006. At Andover-Harvard Theological Library, Harvard Divinity School
“Eyes on the Prize; Interview with Dana Greeley,”  1985-11-22,  American Archive of Public Broadcasting

1908 births
1986 deaths
American Unitarian Universalists
Harvard Divinity School alumni
American Unitarian clergy
Unitarian Universalist clergy
20th-century American clergy